Nikita Igorevich Iosifov (born 11 April 2001) is a Russian footballer who plays as a midfielder for Spanish club Villarreal B.

Club career
He made his Russian Premier League debut for FC Lokomotiv Moscow on 11 August 2020 in a game against FC Rubin Kazan, he substituted Dmitri Barinov in added time.

On 12 July 2021, he joined Villarreal B in Spain on a five-year contract. He was occasionally included in the matchday squads of the senior Villareal team for La Liga and UEFA Champions League games early in the 2021–22 season, but remained on the bench. He made his debut for the senior team on 30 November 2021 in a Copa del Rey game against the sixth-tier club Victoria CF and scored Villareal's last goal in a 8–0 victory. He made his La Liga debut on 22 January 2022 against Mallorca as an added-time substitute for Moi Gómez. At the end of the 2021–22 season, Villareal B was promoted to the second-tier Segunda División.

Career statistics

Club

Honours

Club
Lokomotiv Moscow
Russian Cup: 2020–21

References

External links
 
 
 
 

2001 births
Living people
Footballers from Tambov
Russian footballers
Association football midfielders
Russian Premier League players
Russian Second League players
FC Lokomotiv Moscow players
Primera Federación players
Villarreal CF players
Villarreal CF B players
La Liga players
Segunda División players
Russian expatriate footballers
Russian expatriate sportspeople in Spain
Expatriate footballers in Spain
Russia youth international footballers
Russia under-21 international footballers